Maza is a rural locality (a village) in Semizerye Rural Settlement, Kaduysky District, Vologda Oblast, Russia. The population was 308 as of 2002. There are 7 streets.

Geography 
Maza is located 34 km northwest of Kaduy (the district's administrative centre) by road. Cherepanovo is the nearest rural locality.

References 

Rural localities in Kaduysky District